Course Completed is a 1987 Spanish drama film written, produced and directed  by José Luis Garci.

Awards
The film was an Academy Award nominee as Best Foreign Film. Garci won the Goya Award as Best Director.

See also
 List of submissions to the 60th Academy Awards for Best Foreign Language Film
 List of Spanish submissions for the Academy Award for Best Foreign Language Film

References

External links
 

1987 films
1980s Spanish-language films
Asturias in fiction
Spain in fiction
1987 drama films
Films with screenplays by José Luis Garci
Spanish drama films
Films directed by José Luis Garci
1980s Spanish films